Members of the Legislative Council of Northern Rhodesia from 1941 until 1944 were elected on 29 August 1941. There were eight elected members.

List of members

Elected members

Replacements

Nominated members

References

1941